The 1984 UEFA European Football Championship final tournament was held in France from 12 to 27 June 1984. It was the seventh UEFA European Championship, a competition held every four years and endorsed by UEFA.

At the time, only eight countries took part in the final stage of the tournament, seven of which had to come through the qualifying stage. France qualified automatically as hosts of the event; in the tournament led by Michel Platini, who scored nine goals in France's five matches, Les Bleus won the championship – their first major international title.

Bid process
The hosting of the event was contested by bids from France and West Germany. The French bid was unanimously selected by the UEFA Executive Committee at a meeting on 10 December 1981.

Tournament summary

Group matches
The opening game of tournament featured France and Denmark. The sides played out a very close encounter until Michel Platini's goal on 78 minutes gave the hosts a 1–0 victory. The opening game also saw a premature end to the tournament for Danish midfielder Allan Simonsen, who suffered a broken leg. Platini then scored hat-tricks against both Belgium and Yugoslavia as the French recorded maximum points in Group 1. Denmark took second place in the group with victories over Belgium and Yugoslavia, while Belgium finished third with two points. Yugoslavia, despite going out with no points, gave the hosts a fright in their last group game when they took a 1–0 lead into half-time and then reduced France's 3–1 lead to one goal six minutes from time. The games in Group 1 were unusually high-scoring, and featured 23 goals over the six matches.

Group 2 provided fewer goals, but produced a huge surprise as West Germany failed to qualify for the semi-finals after a 1–0 defeat in their last match to Spain with a late goal by Antonio Maceda, and a late Portugal win against Romania that sent the holders out.

Semi-finals and final
The first semi-final between France and Portugal is often considered one of the best matches in the history of the European Championship. Jean-François Domergue opened the scoring for France but Portugal equalised through Rui Jordão on 74 minutes. The game went to extra time and Jordão scored again in the 98th minute to give the Portuguese a shock lead, but the French rallied and Domergue equalised with six minutes left. Then, in the dying moments of the match and with a penalty shoot-out looming, Platini scored his eighth goal of the championship to give France a memorable 3–2 victory.

The other semi-final between Spain and Denmark saw two evenly matched sides draw 1–1 after extra time, as Søren Lerby's goal after only seven minutes was cancelled out by Maceda’s strike an hour later. The match went to a penalty shoot-out, and Spain converted all five of their penalties to win 5–4 and reach the final for the first time since 1964.

The final was played to a capacity crowd at the Parc des Princes in Paris. Just before the hour mark, Platini scored from a free-kick to put France ahead following a mistake by Spanish goalkeeper Luis Arconada. France were reduced to ten players when Yvon Le Roux was sent off, but Spain were unable to equalise, and Bruno Bellone's goal in injury time made the final score 2–0. France had won their first major championship in world football.

Qualification

Portugal and Romania made their debuts in the European Championship, despite having yet qualified at the World Cup finals. France, the hosts and eventual winners, qualified for the first time since inaugural tournament in 1960, which they also hosted. Denmark qualified for the first time since 1964. Yugoslavia qualified after missing the 1980 tournament. Notable absenties were the 1982 FIFA World Cup winners and Euro 1980 hosts Italy, as well as Czechoslovakia, the Netherlands (who failed to qualify for the last time until 2016) and Hungary.

Qualified teams

Organisation

Tournament format
After trying out several formats, UEFA finally developed for the 1984 tournament the format that would serve for all subsequent eight-team European Championships. The eight qualified teams were split into two groups of four that played a round-robin schedule. The top two teams of each group advanced to semi-finals (reintroduced after being absent from the 1980 tournament) and the winners advanced to the final. The third place play-off, widely perceived as an unnecessary chore, was dropped. As usual at the time, a win was credited with two points only, teams on equal points were ranked by goal difference instead of head-to-head results, and the sudden-death rule in extra time did not apply.

Fixtures were scheduled according to an innovative rotation schedule in which each team played its three first-round matches in three different stadia. Host France, for instance, played in Paris, Nantes, and Saint-Étienne. This formula had the advantage of exposing residents of a given city to more teams but implied multiple and sometimes costly trips from town to town for fans who wanted to follow their side. In subsequent championships, the organisers reverted to conventional schedules in which teams played in one or two cities only.

Overall impressions
Very few hooligan-related incidents were recorded throughout the tournament. Only one minor instance of fan trouble was recorded, in Strasbourg around the West Germany vs. Portugal match. The small group of German hooligans responsible for the incidents was arrested and deported back to West Germany on the same day using a new law specially passed by the French Parliament ahead of the Euro. Overall, the organisation was flawless, a feat that established France's credentials as a host nation and eventually helped it win the right to stage the 1998 FIFA World Cup.

The entire competition was marked by exceptionally fine weather which, along with the high quality of play throughout the tournament (a welcome change from the 1980 European Championship) and the absence of hooligans, contributed to a very positive and enjoyable experience for teams and fans alike.

Mascot
The official mascot of this European Championship was Peno, a rooster, representing the emblem of the host nation, France. It has the number 84 on the left side of its chest and its outfit is the same as the France national team, blue shirt, white shorts and red socks.

Venues
France's winning bid to host the Euro was based on seven stadia. The 48,000-seat Parc des Princes in Paris was the venue for the opening match and the final. Built in 1972, it was still state-of-the-art in 1984 and needed minor improvements only. Marseille's Stade Vélodrome was expanded to 55,000 seats to host one semi-final and some group matches, becoming France's largest stadium on the occasion. Stade de Gerland in Lyon, the venue for the other semi-final and some group matches as well, was thoroughly renovated and expanded to 40,000. Stade Geoffroy-Guichard in Saint-Étienne and Stade Félix-Bollaert in Lens were the other existing stadia that hosted group matches and were expanded to 53,000 and 49,000, respectively. Lastly, two all-new stadia were built to host group matches (and subsequently provided worthy home grounds for the traditionally strong local club teams): Stade de la Beaujoire in Nantes (53,000) was built on an entirely new site while Stade de la Meinau in Strasbourg was rebuilt from the ground up on the site of the old stadium into a modern 40,000-seat arena.

Match officials

 Heinz Fahnler
 Alexis Ponnet
 Vojtech Christov
 Adolf Prokop
 George Courtney
 Michel Vautrot
 Paolo Bergamo
 Jan Keizer
 Bob Valentine
 Augusto Lamo Castillo
 Romualdas Juška
 Erik Fredriksson
 André Daina
 Volker Roth

Squads

Each national team had to submit a squad of 20 players.

Group stage

The teams finishing in the top two positions in each of the two groups progress to the semi-finals, while the bottom two teams in each group were eliminated from the tournament.

All times are local, CEST (UTC+2).

Tiebreakers
If two or more teams finished level on points after completion of the group matches, the following tie-breakers were used to determine the final ranking:
 Greater number of points in all group matches
 Goal difference in all group matches
 Greater number of goals scored in all group matches
 Drawing of lots

Group 1

Group 2

Knockout stage

In the knockout phase, extra time and a penalty shoot-out were used to decide the winner if necessary.

For the first time at a European Championship, there was no third place play-off.

All times are local, CEST (UTC+2).

Bracket

Semi-finals

Final

Statistics

Goalscorers

Awards
UEFA Team of the Tournament

References

External links

 UEFA Euro 1984 at UEFA.com

 
1984
1983–84 in European football
1983–84 in French football
1984
June 1984 sports events in Europe